This is a list of corvettes of World War II.

The List of ships of World War II contains major military vessels of the war, arranged alphabetically and by type. The list includes armed vessels that served during the war and in the immediate aftermath, inclusive of localized ongoing combat operations, garrison surrenders, post-surrender occupation, colony re-occupation, troop and prisoner repatriation, to the end of 1945. 

For smaller vessels, see also List of World War II ships of less than 1000 tons. Some uncompleted Axis ships are included, out of historic interest. Ships are designated to the country under which they operated for the longest period of the World War II, regardless of where they were built or previous service history.

References

Bibliography

 
Corvette
World